23S rRNA (guanine2069-N7)-methyltransferase (rlmK (gene), 23S rRNA m7G2069 methyltransferase) is an enzyme with systematic name S-adenosyl-L-methionine:23S rRNA (guanine2069-N7)-methyltransferase. This enzyme catalyses the following chemical reaction

 S-adenosyl-L-methionine + guanine2069 in 23S rRNA  S-adenosyl-L-homocysteine + N7-methylguanine2069 in 23S rRNA

The enzyme specifically methylates guanine2069 at position N7 in 23S rRNA.

References

External links 
 

EC 2.1.1